The 2018 ASUN men's basketball tournament was the conference postseason tournament for the ASUN Conference. The tournament was the 39th year the league has conducted a postseason tournament. The tournament was held February 26, March 1, and 4, 2018 at campus sites of the higher seeds. Lipscomb defeated regular season champion Florida Gulf Coast in the tournament championship to receive the conference's automatic bid to the NCAA tournament, the school's first trip to the NCAA Tournament.

Seeds
Teams were seeded by record within the conference, with a tiebreaker system to seed teams with identical conference records.

Schedule

Bracket

See also
 2017–18 NCAA Division I men's basketball season
 ASUN men's basketball tournament
 2018 ASUN women's basketball tournament

References

External links 
ASUN Men's Basketball Championship Details

ASUN men's basketball tournament
Tournament
Atlantic Sun men's basketball tournament
Atlantic Sun men's basketball tournament